Michael Coles (born 16 March 1944) is a New Zealand cricketer. He played in 32 first-class and 7 List A matches for Wellington from 1965 to 1976.

See also
 List of Wellington representative cricketers

References

External links
 

1944 births
Living people
New Zealand cricketers
Wellington cricketers
Cricketers from Wellington City